Khamidbi M. Beshtoev (5 May 1943 – 13 May 2016) was a Russian physicist.

References

Russian physicists
2016 deaths
1943 births
Neutrino physicists
Moscow State University alumni